The Deerpark Mines, about 3 km north of Castlecomer, County Kilkenny, were the largest opencast coalmines in Ireland, giving great employment to the area. The mines produced anthracite, a natural smokeless fuel, which unlike other forms of coal is not a major contributor to air pollution and air pollution-related deaths.

Other neighbouring coal mines were the Vera (named after Vera Wandesforde, the eldest daughter of the owner) and the Rock near Glenmullen.

Miners

The Wandesforde family were the owners of the coal mines.  The coalminers lived in the nearby town of Castlecomer, in the villages of Moneenroe and Clogh and all the nearby townslands including Skehana, Mayhora, Firoda, Aughamucky, Glenmullen, Upperhills and Ardra. The Wandesforde family built a quaint terrace of houses for the miners in Kilkenny Street, Castlecomer and a row of cottages at Deerpark as well as several individual cottages throughout the area.

Railway

The mines were connected to the railway system in Ireland in 1919. The connection was closed in 1962.  At peak production in the 1950s, trains carried 300 tons a day to a depot at Kilkenny railway station. Each train carried about 100 tons, which would be loaded on from 10 to 15 carriages.

Heritage

A museum about the mines was opened in 2007 in Castlecomer town.

The maternal grandfather of former US ambassador to the UN Samantha Power, operated as a trades union organiser in the area.

Saying

Anthracite from Castlecomer was the source of the saying about qualities of County Kilkenny: "Fire without smoke."

References

External links
 Mines Home Page  
 Welcome to Castlecomer | Castlecomer.ie
 Castlecomer Discovery Park, Not-for-Profit Outdoor Park in Kilkenny

Surface mines in the Republic of Ireland
Coal mines in the Republic of Ireland
Tourist attractions in County Kilkenny
1924 establishments in Ireland
1969 disestablishments in Ireland